Årdal og Sunndal Verk or ÅSV is a defunct Norwegian state owned company that operated the aluminum plants in Årdal, Sunndal, Høyanger and Holmestrand. The company was established to take advantage of the hydro-electric power plants in the respective villages to create aluminum plants. The company was founded in 1946 to continue the unfinished production of the Årdal plant started by the German occupational forces during World War II. In 1954 construction on the Sunndal plant started. The company was merged with Norsk Hydro in 1986 to create the light metal division Hydro Aluminium.

Formerly government-owned companies of Norway
Manufacturing companies established in 1946
Norsk Hydro
Aluminium companies of Norway
Manufacturing companies disestablished in 1986
1946 establishments in Norway
1986 disestablishments in Norway